Zubayr ibn al-ʿAwwām (594–656) was an Arab Muslim commander in the service of the Islamic prophet Muhammad and the caliphs Abu Bakr and Umar who played a leading role in the Ridda Wars against rebel tribes in Arabia in 632–633 and later participated in early Muslim conquests of Sasanian Iraq in 633–634, Byzantine Syria in 634–638, and the Exarchate of Africa in 639–643.

An early convert to Islam, Zubayr was made the commander by Muhammad for the Battle of Badr in 624, in which Zubayr was instrumental in defeating the opponent forces of the Quraysh. He participated in almost all of the early Muslim battles and expeditions under Muhammad. In the Battle of the Trench, due to his military service, Muhammad bestowed the title Hawari Rasul Allah ('Disciple of Messenger of God') upon him. After Muhammad's demise, Zubayr was appointed as a commander, in the Ridda Wars, by caliph Abu Bakr. He was involved in the defense of Medina and Battle of Yamama. During Umar's caliphate, Zubayr served in the Muslim conquests of Egypt, Levant, Persia, Sudan, and Tripolitania.

After Umar's assassination, Zubayr became an important political figure of the caliphate, being the chief advisor of the Shura that elected the third caliph Uthman. During the latter's caliphate, Zubayr advised the caliph in political and religious issues. After Uthman was assassinated, Zubayr pledged allegiance to the fourth caliph Ali, though later withdrew allegiance, after Ali refused to avenge Uthman's death. Zubayr's forces engaged with Ali's forces in the Battle of the Camel in December 656. In the aftermath, while Zubayr was prostrating in prayer, he was killed by Amr ibn Jurmuz.

Zubayr is generally considered by historians to be one of early Islam's most accomplished commanders. The Sunni Islamic tradition credits Zubayr as being promised paradise. The Shia Islamic tradition views Zubayr negatively. The general's descendants, known as the Zubayrids, are found worldwide.

Ancestry and early life 
His father was the brother of Khadija, Al-Awwam ibn Khuwaylid of the Asad clan of the Quraysh tribe. His mother was Muhammad's aunt, Safiyya bint Abd al-Muttalib. Hence Zubayr was Muhammad's first cousin and brother in law. 

Zubayr ibn al-Awwam was born in Mecca in 594. He had two brothers, Sa'ib and Abd al-Kaaba; and two sisters Hind bint Al-Awwam, who would latter marry Zayd ibn Haritha, and Zaynab bint al-Awwam who will mary her paternal cousin Hakim ibn Hizam. He has also a half-brother, Safi ibn Al-Harith, son of Safiyya bint Abd al-Muttalib precedent wedding with Harb ibn Umayya;.

Al-Awwam died while Zubayr was still young, the day of Al Ablaa, the third year of the Fijar War. His mother, Safiyya, would beat him severely in order to make him "bold in battle". While he was still a boy, Zubayr fought an adult man and beat him up so fiercely that the man's hand was broken. Safiyya, who was pregnant at the time, had to carry the man home.

Conversion to Islam 
Zubayr is said to have entered Islam at the age of 16. He was one of the first men to accept Islam under the influence of Abu Bakr, and is said to have been the fourth or fifth adult male convert.

Zubayr was one of the first fifteen emigrants to Abyssinia in 615, until he returned there in 616. During his stay in Abyssinia, a rebellion against Najashi, king of Aksum and benefactor of the Muslim emigrants, broke out. Najashi met the rebels in battle on the banks of the Nile. The Muslims were greatly worried and decided to send Zubayr to seek news from Najashi. By using an inflated waterskin, he swam down the Nile river until he reached the point where the battle was raging. He watched until Najashi had defeated the rebels and then swam back to the Muslims to report the victory. However, another version recorded Zubayr as crossing the Red Sea from the coast of the Arabian Peninsula.

Zubayr was among those who returned to Mecca in 619 when he heard that the Meccans had converted to Islam. However, as they approached Mecca, they learned that the report was false, and they had to enter the town under the protection of a citizen or by stealth. While he stayed with early converts of Islam in Mecca, Zubayr was given a shared responsibility as a hafiz, someone who memorized every verse of the Quran, along with Abu Bakr, Abdur Rahman ibn Auf, Talha and Sa'd ibn Abi Waqqas. Zubayr joined the general emigration to Medina in 622. At first he lodged with Al-Mundhir ibn Muhammad. It is disputed who became Zubayr's sworn brother, as various traditions name different people, including Abdullah ibn Mas'ud, Talhah, Ka'b ibn Malik, or Salama ibn Salama. As a shrewd merchant, Zubayr diverted his trading business route from Mecca to Medina at the beginning of the emigration.

Military career

Zubayr served as one of three main commanders of the Muslim forces in the Battle of Badr, along with Hamza ibn Abdul-Muttalib and Ali. In the course of the battle, he killed the Quraish champion Ubayda ibn Sa'id Umayya clan. According to some accounts Zubayr also killed Nawfal ibn Khuwaylid, although others credit his death to Ali.

At the Battle of Uhud, Zubayr volunteered to take up Muhammad's sword, though Muhammad chose to give the sword to Abu Dujana al-Ansari instead. When the tide of the battle turned against the Muslim forces and many fled, Zubayr was among the few to stand with Muhammad. According to Mubarakpuri, Muhammad praised Zubayr as the "Hawari" for the first time due to his killing of Ibn Abi Talhah, a standard bearer of the Banu Abd al-Dar tribe. During the last phase of the battle, when the tide of the battle were changed as now the Muslim forces has suffered setback from Khalid ibn al-Walid counterattack, the Muslims ranks were separated each others.

Not long after the battle of Uhud, Muhammad sent Zubayr and Abu Bakr to chase the victorious Quraish forces in Hamra al-Asad, where they captured a Quraish soldier from Banu Jumah, Abu Izzah al-Jumahi. Muhammad then ordered Zubayr to execute Abu Izzah for breaking his promise with Muhammad at the battle of Badr to not involve himself in the war against them anymore.

Later, after the invasion of Banu Nadir which resulted in the exile of Banu al-Nadir from Medina, their landed estates, which included palm-date gardens and cultivation fields along with their fortress residences, were confiscated and divided among the Muslims. Zubayr and Abu Salamah ibn `Abd al-Asad were acquired a shared property of al-Buwaylah from this campaign.

Battle of the Trench 
During the Battle of the Trench, Zubayr fought and killed Nawfal ibn Abdullah ibn Mughirah al Makhzumi in a duel. However, other chroniclers such as Ibn Hajar Al-Asqalani recorded the man killed by Zubayr as Uthman ibn Mughirah al Makhzumi. The Muslim defenders cheered and praised the sharpness of the sword which Zubayr used, only for Zubayr to reply that it is not his sword which need to be complimented, but the strength of the arm which held the sword. Zubayr caused the enemy horsemens to flee after he strike the horse of Qurayshite warrior named Hubayr ibn Abi Wahb al Makhzumi, cutting the horse armour and crupper of Hubayr horse. Zubayr also played a reconnaissance role when he volunteered to spy on the Qurayza tribe for Muhammad. The latter then praised Zubayr: "Every Prophet has a disciple, and my disciple is Al-Zubayr."

After the battle, Muhammad immediately instructed the Muslim army to march without ceasing or resting to the settlement of Banu Qurayza, a Jewish tribe who had betrayed the Muslims in the previous battle. Banu Qurayza was besieged for several days before the Muslim soldiers, including Zubayr, broke through with a battering ram, and forced the surrender and execution of the garrison.

Pledge of the Tree 

In March 628 CE (6 AH), Muhammad set out for Mecca to perform the ritual pilgrimage of Umrah. The Quraysh denied the Muslims entry into the city and posted themselves outside Mecca, determined to offer resistance even though the Muslims did not have any intention or preparation for battle, which caused Muhammad to send Uthman ibn Affan as his envoy to meet with the leaders of Quraysh and negotiate their entry into the city. The Quraysh had Uthman stay longer in Mecca than they originally planned, which caused Muhammad to believe that Uthman had been killed. In response, Muhammad gathered his nearly 1,400 Sahaba and called them to pledge to fight until death and avenge the death of Uthman. After the pledge, verses were revealed in the Qur'an commemorating and appreciating the pledge and those who made it:

Due to this verse, the pledge is also known as the Pledge of Acceptance as it was believed in Islam to be a cause for God's blessing towards those who took pledge, including Zubayr, while at the same day, the ratification of treaty of Hudaybiyyah also occurred.

Battle of Khaybar 
In 628, Zubayr participated in the Battle of Khaybar, defeating the Jewish champion Yassir in single combat. Afterward, the Muslims commented on how sharp his sword must have been; Zubayr replied that it had not been sharp but he had used it with great force. Later during the battle, Zubayr fought and killed another opposing champion in a duel. After the Muslims had conquered any of these eight Khaybar fortresses, the Jewish treasurer, Kinana, was brought to Muhammad, but he refused to reveal where their money was hidden. However, later Muhammad ibn Maslama decapitated Kinana, in retaliation for his brother Mahmud, who had been killed in the battle a few days earlier. Zubayr was later made one of the eighteen chiefs who each supervised the division of a block of the spoils of victory.

Later, as the Muslim forces returned to Medina from Khaybar, they passed one more hostile Jewish fortress in Wadi al-Qura. During this battle Zubayr facing at least two enemy who challenged him to a duel; Zubayr accepted and defeated them both.

Conquest of Mecca until death of Muhammad 
In December 629, on the eve of the Conquest of Mecca, Zubayr and Ali brought back to Muhammad a letter from a spy intended for the Quraysh, making Muhammad confident that the Muslims would now take Mecca by surprise. When Muhammad entered Mecca, Zubayr held one of the three banners of the Emigrants and commanded the left wing of the conquering army.

Later, during the Battle of Hunayn in 630 CE (8 AH), the Hawazin tribe forces under Malik ibn Awf ambushed the Muslims under the valley, which drove almost the entire Muslim army into retreat except Muhammad and several of his men, possibly including Zubayr.  However, the Hawazin forces paused as they almost surrounded Muhammad and his followers, giving time for the Muslim army to regroup. After they consolidated themselves and rescued Khalid, who has been gravely injured during the first clash, the Muslims commenced a general counterattack, with Zubayr on the front of the Rashidun cavalry. The Hawazin forces were immediately driven out of the valley by the frontal attack led by Zubayr after a short engagement. Nafi' ibn Jubayr reported that he saw Abbas ibn Abd al-Muttalib passing instructions from Muhammad to Zubayr to plant the rallying flag. After the battles in Awtas, the Muslims engaged in the lengthy Siege of Ta'if, although they did not succeed in forcing an immediate surrender of the Hawazin. Later, Zubayr participated in the last campaign with Muhammad, the Expedition of Tabuk.

At some point, Muhammad assigned Zubayr and Jahm ibn al-Suht to be registrars and auditors of the zakat funds. Muhammad also employ Al-Zubayr as one of his scribe. After the death of Muhammad, Ali ibn Zayd and several Tabi'un mentioned the scars covering Zubayr's body from wounds that he had suffered. It is said that in all of the battles with Muhammad, Zubayr wore a distinctive yellow turban, except for the Battle of Hunayn, in which he reportedly wore a red one.

During Rashidun caliphate

Ridda Wars 
In the third week of July 632, during the Ridda Wars, the rebel army under Tulayha moved from Dhu Qissa to Dhu Hussa, from where they prepared to launch an attack on Medina. Abu Bakr received intelligence of the rebel movements, and immediately prepared for the defense of Medina in the form of newly organised elite guard unit al-Ḥaras wa-l-shurṭa to guard Medina. Zubayr was appointed as one commander of these units. These troops rode to the mountain passes of Medina at night, intercepting the rebel forces and forcing them to retreat to Dhu Qisha.

Later, Abu Bakr insisted on sending Usama ibn Zayd to Balqa to execute the last will of Muhammad. The caliph appointed Zubayr, Umar ibn al-Khattab, and Khalid ibn al-Walid as officers under Usama. Tabari states that the expedition was successful, and Usama reached Syria and became the first Muslim force to successfully raid Byzantine territory, thus paving the way for the subsequent Muslim conquests of Syria and Egypt from the Byzantine Empire.

Since all horses and trained camels were brought by main army to Balqa, Abu Bakr and the rest of Haras forces left in the capital had to resort to fighting the rebels with only untrained camels. However, as the rebels retreated to the foothills on the outskirts of the city, Abu Bakr and the Medinese army could not catch up to the battle in the outskirt of Medina due to their untrained camels, so they had to wait until the next day to gather momentum for the second strike. The Medinese army engaged the rebels in the Battle of Zhu Qissa, which resulted in a rout of the rebel army. Then, after the rebels retreated from the outskirt of Medina, the caliph went further to the north to crush another Bedouin rebellion in Dumat al-Jandal.

Later, according to Ibn Hisham on secondhand testimony, as Khalid ibn al-Walid engaged the biggest rebel faction led by Musaylimah, Zubayr has participated in the Battle of Yamama while bringing the ten-year old Abd Allah ibn al-Zubayr on his horse. Hisham ibn Urwah has recorded that when the Muslim army faced a dire situation in the battle, while one of Zubayr brother, Sa'ib ibn al-Awwam had also fallen during the battle, Zubayr gave a rousing speech towards the Muslims to reinvigorate their spirit, which then followed with the Muslims pushing back until they gained the upper hand in the battle.

Campaign in Levant 

During the Rashidun invasion of the Levant, after Abu Ubayda ibn al-Jarrah had pacified the area in Moab, he sent Zubayr and Fadl ibn Abbas to subdue the city of Amman. Waqidi recorded that Said ibn Aamir al-Jumahi testified that during the battle, he saw in the front of Muslim army Zubayr and Fadl fighting ferociously against the Byzantines atop of their horses. Said ibn Amir followed by saying that the Rashidun army butchered the fleeing Byzantine soldiers, while some were captured as prisoners of war. Then Zubair managed to kill the Byzantine commander Nicetas and subdued the city of Amman.

Battle of the Yarmuk 
Later, Zubayr participated in the Battle of the Yarmuk in 636. In the battle, Zubayr was placed on the left wing commanded by Yazid ibn Abi Sufyan, leading his personal squadron among other dozen squadrons of the left wing. Zubayr twice charged alone against the row of Byzantine soldiers, breaking up their ranks and suffering a heavy shoulder injury in the process. Abdullah ibn Zubayr, who at that time was still a child and was carried on his father's chest, testified that his father was doing the salah prayer on top of his camel while fighting the enemy at the same time. At some point, Zubayr fought side by side with Khalid ibn al-Walid and Hashim ibn Utba (also known as Hashim al-Marqal) until the three of them reached the tent of Vahan, commander of the Armenian division of the Byzantines, causing the chaotic retreat of the Armenian ranks. Zubayr's brother, Abd al Rahman al-Zubayr, died in the battle.

After the battle at Yarmuk, Zubayr continued to accompany the Muslim army in the Levant and captured the coastal city of Ayla (modern-day Aqaba). After Jerusalem had been subdued, Zubayr accompanied caliph Umar to visit the city.

Campaign in Persia 
In 635 to 636, the caliph assembled his council, including Zubayr, Ali, and Talhah, about the battle plan to face the Persian army of Rostam Farrokhzad in Qadisiyyah. At first the caliph himself led the forces (including Zubayr) from Arabia to Iraq, but the council urges Umar not to lead the army and instead appoint someone else, as his presence was needed more urgently in the capital. Umar agreed and asked the council to suggest the commander to lead the army. The council agreed to sent Sa'd ibn Abi Waqqas; Sa'd served as the overall commander on Persian conquest and won the Battle of al-Qadisiyyah.

Later, the caliph heard that Sassanid forces from Mah, Qom, Hamadan, Ray, Isfahan, Azerbaijan, and Nahavand had gathered in Nahavand to counter the Arab invasion. Caliph Umar responded by assembling a war council consisting of Zubayr, Ali, Uthman ibn Affan, Talha, Sa'd ibn Abi Waqqas, Abd al-Rahman ibn Awf, and Abbas ibn Abd al-Muttalib to discuss the strategy to face the Sassanids in Nahavand. The caliph want to lead the army himself, but Ali urged the caliph to instead delegate the battlefield commands to the field commanders. The caliph decides to send Zubayr, Tulayha, Amr ibn Ma'adi Yakrib, Abdullah ibn Amr Al-Ash'ath ibn Qays and others under the command of Al-Nu'man ibn Muqrin to go to Nahavand, to face the army of the Sasanian Empire in the battle of Nahavand. The reinforcements sent to aid the army in Nahavand numbered 4,000 soldiers. Then as the reinforcements from Medina arrived in Nahavand, Umar gave further instruction for the army from Kufa under Hudhayfah ibn al-Yaman and the army of Basra under Abu Musa al-Ashari to merge with al-Nu'man's army under the overall command of al-Nu'man. The Arabs won a huge victory (hailed by medieval chroniclers as Fatih al-Futuh or "victory of victories") against the 150,000-man Sassanid army, more than half of whom were killed.

Later, after the siege of Shushtar, the Sassanid's chief commander, Hormuzan was captured by the Rashidun army. Zubayr then urged caliph Umar to pardon Hormuzan, which Umar granted.

Campaign in Africa 

After the conquest of Jerusalem caliph Umar stayed for while in Jerusalem, Amr ibn al-As, who at that time was in Egypt besieging a Byzantine fortress, sent a message to Umar asking for reinforcements of exactly 8,000 soldiers. However, since at the moment the available manpower of the caliphate was strained, the caliph was only able to send 4,000 soldiers, led by four commanders. The four commanders were two veteran Muhajireen, Zubayr and Miqdad ibn Aswad, and two Ansari commanders named Maslama ibn Mukhallad al-Ansari and Ubadah ibn al-Samit. However, Baladhuri, Ibn al-Athir and Ibn Sa'd recorded that the four commander were Zubayr, Busr ibn Abi Artat, Umayr ibn Wahb, and Kharija ibn Hudhafa.

There are differing opinions regarding the number of soldiers which Zubayr brought: some say 12,000, others only 8,000. Military historian Khalid Mahmud supports the view that the force with Zubayr numbered 4,000 fighters, as it is similar to the number of soldiers in previous reinforcements at the battles of the Yarmuk, al-Qadisiyyah and later to the battle of Nahavand. The second reason was the abrupt request for aid from Egypt only allowed for a small number of soldiers.

As they arrived in Egypt, Zubayr immediately helped the Rashidun army capture the city of Faiyum. After the fall of Faiyum, Zubayr march to Ain Shams to assist 'Amr in besieging the Byzantine fortress at Heliopolis, which had been besieged before by 'Amr unsuccessfully for months. At Heliopolis Zubayr helped repel a surprise Byzantine counterattack at night against the Rashidun forces. The Byzantines eventually surrendered and the prefect of the city Al-Muqawqis, agreed to pay 50,000 gold coins.

Later, during the Siege of Babylon Fortress, early chroniclers the mid medieval chronicler Qatadah reported that Zubayr personally led his soldiers climbing the walls of the fortress, then instructed his troops to shout Takbir the moment he reached the top of the wall. Zubayr immediately descended from the top of the wall and opened the gates, which caused the entire Muslim army to enter, prompting the terrified Muqawqis to surrender. In Tabari's version, it was the Byzantine garrison who opened the gate as they immediately surrendered after witnessed Zubayr climbing the fortress wall. Ibn Abd al-Hakam noted that Zubayr skipped the siege of Alexandria, as the siege was conducted by 'Ubadah ibn al-Samit.

Conquest of al-Bahnasa 
Later in 639, the Rashidun forces marched south to the Byzantine city named Oxyrhynchus (al-Bahnasa in Arabic). 'Amr delegated Khalid ibn al-Walid to lead Zubayr and a Muslim army of 10,000 under his command to invade the city, where they faced Sudanese Christian auxiliaries of the Byzantine-Beja coalition in the Battle of Darishkur.

Before the battle, the Rashidun army camped in a place which called Dashur. Benjamin Hendrickx reported that the African Christians mustered around 20,000 symmachoi (black Sudanese auxiliary units of Byzantine), 1,300 war elephants with howdahs housing archers, and anti-cavalry units named al-Quwwad armed with iron staffs, all of them commanded by a patrician named Batlus. Al-Maqrizi and Waqidi stated in this conflict, Zubayr alongside Miqdad, Dhiraar ibn al-Azwar, and Uqba ibn Amir each led 500 Rashidun cavalry to fight against the elephant corps of Batlus, by using spears soaked in santonin plants and sulfur which then ignite their spears with flames to drive the elephants back in terror. while the elephant riders were toppled from the elephant's back and crushed underfoot on the ground. Meanwhile, the Quwwad warriors who used iron staffs were routed by the Rashidun cavalry soldiers who used a seized chain weapons on their hands to disarm the Quwwad staff weapons from their hands. It was narrated by Rafi' ibn Malik that the final phase of this battle occurred when Zubayr and several other commanders led a night raid with 1,000 Rashidun cavalry, which routed the enemy encampments and seized many spoils, including numerous sheep.

After the victory at Darishkur, the Byzantine Sudanese forces fled to al-Bahnasa and locked the gates, which was followed by the Muslims besieging the town, as the Byzantines were reinforced by the arrival of 50,000 men, according to the report of al-Maqqari. The siege dragged on for months, until Khalid ibn al Walid commanded Zubayr, Dhiraar ibn al-Azwar and other commanders to intensify the siege and assigned them to lead around 10,000 Companions of the Prophet, among them 70 who were veterans of battle of Badr. They besieged the city for 4 months as Miqdad lead 200 horsemens, while Zubayr led 300 horsemen, and Dhiraar, Abdullah ibn Umar, Uqba ibn Amir al-Juhani 200 horsemen each. They camped in a village which was later renamed as Qays village, in honor of Qays ibn Harith, the overall commander of the Rashidun cavalry. The Byzantines and their Coptic allies showered the Rashidun army with arrows and stones from the city wall, until the Rashidun overcame the defenders, as Dhiraar came out from the battle with his entire body stained in blood, having slain 160 Byzantine soldiers during the battle. Chroniclers recorded that the Rashidun army finally breached the city gate under either Khalid ibn al-Walid or Qays ibn Harith.

After the conquest of Egypt and Sudan, al-Zubayr followed 'Amr to the west. The Muslim army under Amr continued their campaign toward Tripolitania. It is recorded during the lengthy siege of Tripoli, seven or eight Muslim soldiers from the Madhlij tribe of Kinanah accidentally spotted an unguarded side of Tripoli and managed to slip into the city unnoticed. Caught off guard, the confused Byzantine garrison was thrown in panic by the intruders and fled with their ships anchored in the harbor. These Madhlij warriors used this opportunity to open the town gate and inform 'Amr, who led the Muslim army to enter the city unopposed.  After they subdued Tripoli, Libda, and Sirte in 643 AD (22 AH), 'Amr sent Zubayr to besiege Sabratha in advance, before 'Amr joined him. In 644, after Zubayr and Amr had stormed Sabratha, they continued on to conquer Sharwas, a city in the Nafusa Mountains.

However, further conquests in Africa came to halt after caliph Umar instructed them to restrain from advancing and consolidate the pacified region first. In 642, Zubayr settled in a house adjacent to the Mosque of Amr ibn al-As, neighboring the homes of other Sahabah such as Abd Allah ibn Amr ibn al-As, Abu Ayyub al-Ansari, Abu Dharr al-Ghifari, Abdullah ibn Umar, and Ubadah.

At some point during Umar's reign, when Zubayr was in Medina, he along with Miqdad and the caliph's son, Abdullah ibn Umar, went to Khaybar to collect their share of the profits from properties and plantations in Khaybar in which they held a stake. These properties were managed and worked by the Jewish tribes of Khaybar, who has been subdued during the time of Muhammad. However, the Jewish tribes in Khaybar refused and instead hurt Abdullah ibn Umar, who suffered a broken hand from their harassment. This prompted caliph Umar to expel the entire Jewish population from Khaybar and give the properties to Muslim overlords.

Reign of caliph Uthman 
Later, as caliph Umar was dying in 644, he selected Zubayr and five other men to elect the next caliph. Zubayr personally gave his own vote to nominate Ali as caliph. After this, Zubayr officially served as a member of Majlis-ash-Shura, which was responsible for the elections of the caliph and functioned as a governmental advisory council regarding the law.

Later, in the year of 27 AH, during the Muslim conquest of North Africa, Zubayr and his son, Abdullah were sent by caliph Uthman as reinforcements for Abdallah ibn Sa'd when fighting a Byzantine splinter group of about 120,000 under Gregory the Patrician. During this battle, Zubayr's son, Abdullah ibn Zubayr, played a pivotal role as he led an attack that caught Gregory off guard when the two forces were still in stalemate, and decapitated the Byzantine general, causing the resistance of the Byzantine army to crumble as their morale plummeted.

When Abdullah ibn Masud passed away, Zubayr petitioned caliph Uthman  to give Abdullah's pension to his heirs, which was granted by the caliph. Later, when Miqdad ibn al-Aswad, one of Zubayr's fellow veterans, passed away from illness, Miqdad left a message for Zubayr to manage and sell one of his estates, from which the proceeds would be donated to Hasan ibn Ali and Husayn ibn Ali, with each receiving 18,000 dirhams from the endowment, while from the rest he also asked Zubayr to give each of Muhammad's wives 7,000 dirhams.

Zubayr's engagement in caliph Uthman's policy of land exchanging resulted in him gaining lands in Egypt, such as Fustat and Alexandria.

First civil war and Zubayr's death 

Uthman was assassinated in 656. Zubayr had reason to hope that he would be elected as the next caliph, although he knew that his old ally Talha was also a strong contender. However, Ali was elected, to the debate of Muhammad's widow Aisha. Thereupon Zubayr met with Aisha and Talha in Mecca, claiming he had only given allegiance to Ali at swordpoint.

Zubayr, Talha and Aisha called for Uthman's death to be avenged, and while Ali agreed, he said that he was not able to do it at the time. The allies then gathered an army and marched to Basra, where they defeated the governor and took over the city, putting to death everyone who had been implicated in the assassination of Uthman. When they were challenged over why they now cared about Uthman, when they had shown him so much hostility during his lifetime, they claimed: "We wanted Uthman to meet our demands. We didn't want him to be killed."

According to Adrian Brocket's translation of Tabari, Ali behaved like a man who suspected hostility towards himself, for he soon entered Basra with a professional army of 20,000. For several days, there were negotiations, as both sides asserted they wanted only to see justice done. But on 7 December 656, hostilities erupted as Aisha's warriors killed Ali's messenger-boy, and Ali responded, "Battle is now justified, so fight them!"

Meanwhile, Ibn Kathir in his book al Bidaya wa Nihaya recorded a more detailed version that the side of Zubayr, Aisha, and Talha were in the way of agreement with Ali as through negotiation of al-Qa'qa ibn Amr as arbitrator. However, suddenly Abdullah ibn Saba', Malik al-Ashtar and Shuraih ibn Awfa incited a riot within the ranks of Ali's soldiers during the negotiations, plunging both sides into confusion and thus inciting the start of the combat. This, however, is not a tenable argument because Abullah ibn Saba' is a fictitious figure who, historians have proven, never existed and Malik al-Ashtar was the commander of Ali and very close to him - it is not conceivable that he would act against his caliph's orders or incite a riot without Ali's consent. Imputing the start of the war to Ali's camp is typically Umayyad revisionism.

The battle started, but according to some traditions at some point Zubayr lost the desire to fight. He said that Ali had talked him out of it during the negotiations on the grounds that they were cousins, and reminding him that the Prophet had once told Zubayr that he would one day fight Ali and he (Zubayr) would be on the wrong side. Zubay's son 'Abd Allah accused him of fearing Ali's army. 'Abd Allah was hostile to Ali because his mother was Aisha's sister and she had raised him like her son. In a sermon of his, Ali laments that 'Zubayr remained a part of our family until his wretched son Abd Allah came along'. Whatever the case, Zubayr left the battlefield while Aisha continued to direct her troops from her camel. A man named Amr ibn Jarmouz decided to track Zubayr's movements and followed him to a nearby field. It was time for prayer so, after each had asked the other what he was doing there, they agreed to pray. While Zubayr was prostrating, Amr ibn Jurmuz stabbed him in the neck and killed him.

Legacy

In Islamic scholarship 

Zubayr is generally viewed by Islamic scholars as an important figure, who collectively classified Zubayr as being among the highest-ranked Companions of the Prophet, due to his inclusion among the ten Muslims to whom Muhammad guaranteed Paradise while they were still alive,. This veneration of Zubayr's piety and high importance was highlighted by both classical and contemporary scholars, such as Ibn Taymiyyah.  The Hadith were also highlighted and approved by the 18th Hanbalite scholar and founder of Wahhabism, Muhammad ibn Abd al-Wahhab, whose opinion regarding Zubayr concurred with Muhammad ibn al-Uthaymeen's, another Hanbalite scholar and grand mufti of Saudi Arabia.

Aside from his inclusion in the hadith about ten companion who guaranteed paradise, scholars also exalted Zubayr for these six particular events:

 His migration from Mecca to Medina, for their perseverance and willingness to leave worldly possessions in favor of mass migration due to the instruction of Muhammad.
 The Battle of Badr, at which he won an honorific title of Al-Badri. 
 The Battle of Uhud, for which he received the title of Al-Uhudi.
 The Battle of Hamra al-Asad
 The Battle of the Trench, for which Muhammad himself bestowed upon him the special title of Hawari Rasulullah for his distinguished service.
 The Pledge of the Tree.

Shia Muslims generally view Zubayr negatively, as he is considered a heretic for his involvement in the Battle of the Camel.

Prayer and ethics 

Zubayr established a number of traditions in Islamic prayer and ethics, including a prayer gesture of clasping his right middle, ring, and pinky fingers while pointing the index finger and putting the thumb above the clasped middle finger, whether to sit down while eating and drinking, prohibiting sleep during Sübh, and reciting sura Ar-Ra'd, Ayah 13| whenever a Muslim hears the sound of thunder.

Hadith and law 

As one of principal companions of Muhammad who followed him from the beginning of Islam, many hadith are attributed to Zubayr. However, there are very few hadith from Zubayr in comparison with other companions of Muhammad, as he was reluctant to tell many hadith about Muhammad even though he had been constantly in his company. As he explained to his son Abdullah, "I heard Allah’s Messenger say, ‘Anyone who tells a lie about me should take a seat in the Fire.'"

In his exegesis, Zubayr emphasized the importance of sunnah and tradition as guidance, as opposed to the more analytical qiyas method of Ahl al-Ra'y. Thus, Sunni Islam Madhhab scholars have accepted hadith and exegesis from Zubayr as the source of Islam jurisprudence.

Zubayr's ruling on Islamic law have been influential to the Shafi'i, Hanbali, Hanafi, and Zahiri schools.

Contemporary 

In the modern era, Permanent Committee for Scholarly Research and Ifta in Saudi Arabia used the practice of Zubayr as one of their source of fatawa, such as an act of government to spying any endangering act from enemy of the state, such as criminal behavior, alleged terrorism, and other illegal conduct. The committee based this ruling of espionage from the act of Zubayr of spying on Banu Qurayza for their alleged betrayal during the Battle of the Trench on the instruction of Muhammad.

In Egypt, Zubayr's jurisprudence has had widespread influence, as Grand Mufti of Egypt, Muhammad Sayyid Tantawy recorded that due to Zubayr and 'Amr ibn al-As's long stay in Egypt, Muslims in Egypt and Faqīh scholars of the country base much of their fatwa and rulings on Zubayr's verdicts during his tenure in Africa.

Rules of war 
Zubayr's conduct has been influential on Islamic interpretation of the rules of war, such as the use of military deception, the division of spoils of war at the Battle of the Yarmuk, the treatment of prisoners of war, and the use of torture as a method of interrogation.

Entrepreneurship 

Zubayr was known to be very wealthy as a result of his business career. His practice of offering loans with no interest became widespread in the Islamic world.

Manumission of slaves 

Zubayr owned at least a thousand slaves and reportedly freed one each day. Some of his ex-slaves became prominent in their own right, including Yarba ibn Rabban Mawla az-Zubayr, who became a scholar of hadith. Another slave who gained prominence was Abu Yahya Mawla az-Zubayr. Daniel Pipes argued that the practice of early Muslims such as Zubayr and Uthman ibn Affan of owning massive number of slaves and casual manumissions was the first indication of Mamluk, an Islamic military slave system.

Descendants 

Zubayr's status as an early Muslim hero and model of religious piety prompted many ethnic communities across the world to claim themselves as his descendants. particularly in Hejaz and Egypt. The Zubairi community which dwells in India and Pakistan also claims Zubayr as their ancestor, as descendant clans of Zubayr allegedly migrated from their homeland to the Indian subcontinent during the Umayyad campaigns in India in the 7th century AD.

The descendants of Zubayr, known as Zubayrids, were influential in Iraq and Iran.

Personal characteristics 
Zubayr is described as of medium height, lean, dark-complexioned, and hairy, though with a thin beard. His hair hung down to his shoulders, and he did not dye it after it turned white. Other reports consider him burly and tall. Much of his body was covered with battle scars from his many military engagements. He was said to possess extraordinary physical strength, As he was said being able to split an adult man body perfectly into two with a single blow of his sword.

Zubayr owned many horses, and established a high quality pedigree which was bred by his descendants for generations. He possessed a large number of properties, many slaves, and vast wealth, though he was said to be generous.

Family 

|-
|style="text-align: left;"|

Zubayr married eight times and had twenty children.

Asma bint Abi Bakr. They were married before the Hijra of 622 and divorced when Urwa was young, around 645.
Abdullah
Al-Mundhir
Asim
Al-Muhajir
Khadija the Elder
Umm Al-Hasan
Aisha
Urwa
Umm Kulthum bint Uqba of the Umayya clan. They were married in 629, but she disliked him, and they were divorced in a matter of months. After their daughter was born, Umm Kulthum married Abdur Rahman bin Awf.
Zaynab
Al-Halal bint Qays of the Asad tribe.
Khadija the Younger
Umm Khalid Ama bint Khalid of the Umayya clan. She was one of the emigrants who returned from Abyssinia in 628.
Khalid
Amr
Habiba
Sawda
Hind
Ar-Rabbab bint Unayf of the Kalb tribe.
Mus'ab
Hamza
Ramla
Atiqa bint Zayd of the Adi clan, a widow of Umar.
Tumadir bint Al-Asbagh of the Kalb tribe, a widow of Abdur Rahman ibn Awf. Al-Zubayr divorced her only seven days after the wedding. She used to tell other women, "When one of you marries, she should not be deceived by seven days after what Al-Zubayr has done to me." She did not, however, enlarge on the nature of the "deception".
Umm Ja'far Zaynab bint Marthad of the Thaalaba tribe.
Ubayda
Ja'far

There were reports from Zubayr's wives that he had "some harshness towards women". Atiqa only agreed to marry him on the condition that he would never beat her. However, contemporary writer Abdo Khal questioned the validity of this narration as he viewed the stories as based on unverified laymen interpretations in modern social media.

Zubayr gave his male children the names of the Sahaba who died as martyrs: 
 Abd-Allah ibn Jahsh who died in the Battle of Uhud for Abd Allah ibn al-Zubayr
 Urwah ibn Mas'ud, who was killed by people of Tha'if, for Urwah ibn Zubayr
 Mus'ab ibn Umayr  for Mus'ab ibn al-Zubayr
 Khalid ibn Sa'id, who died in Battle of Marj as-Saffar for Khalid ibn al-Zubayr
 Amr ibn Sa'id ibn al-Aas, who was killed during Battle of Yarmouk, for Amr ibn al-Zubayr. 
 Muhajir ibn Ziyad, who was killed during the Siege of Shushtar Muhajir ibn az-Zubayr.
 Mundhir ibn Amr, who was killed during the tragedy of Bir Ma'una for Munhdir ibn az-Zubayr.

The two most notable of his sons were Abdullah ibn al-Zubayr, who claimed the caliphate during the reign of Yazid ibn Muawiyah, along with Zubayr's youngest son from Asma', Urwah ibn al-Zubayr, member of the most influential group of jurists known collectively as The Seven Fuqaha of Medina, prominent hadith scholar, and the first writer of Seerah or Maghazi.

One of Zubayr's daughters, Ramlah bint al-Zubayr, married the Umayyad prince Khalid ibn Yazid, despite the fact that Khalid was also the one who had killed Ramlah's brother Mus'ab ibn al-Zubayr in the Battle of Maskin in 691. Ibn Asakir recorded that Ramlah was famous for her extraordinary beauty. Ramlah's beauty inspired Khalid to extoll her in his poems. However, this caused some trouble for Khalid, as various factions who disliked the Umayyad regime, such as the Shu'ubiyya movement, the Shia, and the Kharijites, spread exaggerated rumors regarding Khalid's poems for Ramlah. When these rumors reached the ears of the caliph Abd al-Malik ibn Marwan, he in turn berated and scolded Khalid's conduct, which the caliph regarded as vanity.

See also 
List of expeditions of Muhammad
Sunni view of the Sahaba
The ten to whom Paradise was promised
List of Sahabah
First Fitna

References

Notes

Primary sources 
 Recorded traditional oral narration of historical events during the early time of Islam of Urwah ibn Zubayr, an historian during Rashidun era.
 Earliests records of Maghazi (historical records regarding Islamic conquests) of Muhammad by Tabi'in historian Aban ibn Uthman
 Recorded narrations of Maghazi classifications by Ibn Shihab al-Zuhri
 Musnad Ahmad ibn Hanbal, which contains many scarces of historical account regarding military activity during the time of Muhammad and four righteous guided caliphate
 Sahih Bukhari Chapter 57: Book of Jihad, regarding ethics and basics of warfare according to Islamic tradition
 Sahih Muslim Chapter 19: Kitab Al-Jihad Wa'l-Siyar (The Book of Jihad And Expedition), regarding ethics and conduct during wartime
 Musnad Ahmad ibn Hanbal, a collection of hadith compiled by the Ahmad ibn Hanbal(d. 241 AH/855 AD) to whom the Hanbali fiqh(legislation) is attributed
 'Jami at-Tirmidhi', also known as Sunan at-Tirmidhi, is one of "the six books" (Kutub al-Sittah – the six major hadith collections); authored by Al-Tirmidhi
 Sunan Abu Dawood, one of the Kutub al-Sittah (six major hadith collections), collected by Abu Dawud al-Sijistani
 Masabih al-Sunnah contained narrations of the peoples who lived during the Rashidun conquests, including those directly involved in the conquest. Authored by Al-Baghawi
 Al-Sirah al-Nabawiyyah (The Life of the Prophet), an edited recension by Ibn Isḥāq
 Tarikh al-Islam al-kabir, 'Great History of Islam' (50 vols., in Arabic); Ibn Hajar received it from adh-Dhahabi
 Siyar a`lam al-nubala, biographical manuscript of Companion of the prophet, authored by adh-Dhahabi
 History of the Prophets and Kings, more commonly known as Tarikh al-Tabari or Tarikh-i Tabari or The History of al-Tabari 
 Historical excerpts from Abu Bakr al-Zubaydi, scholar and historian from the Caliphate of Córdoba
 History of Damascus (Arabic: Tarikh Dimashq) is one of the most important books about the Islamic history of Syria, covering the life of important figures who resided in or visited Damascus. Authored by Ibn Ashakir
 Futuh al-Buldan, The Conquest of (the) countries, a work regarding early Islamic conquest 9th century historian Ahmad Ibn Yahya al-Baladhuri of Abbasid-era Baghdad
 Futūḥ mișr wa akhbārahā, Conquest of Egypt and some account of it, i.e. of the country) authored by Ibn Abd al-Hakam
 Kitab al-Tarikh wa al-Maghazi (Arabic: كتاب التاريخ والمغازي, "Book of History and Campaigns") by al-Waqidi.
  Sahdba ma'a yl-Batlus(The book of the conquest of al-Bahnasa and what befell the Companions of the Prophet with the Patrician Batlus).
 Al-Mawāʻiẓ wa-al-Iʻtibār bi-Dhikr al-Khiṭaṭ wa-al-āthār; a historical excerpt authored by al-Maqrizi.
 Genealogical Kawahla Nisba manuscript by Sheykh Abdullah Gadula Balilu al-Kawahla.
 Zubayrids governor coin inscription found by modern archaeologs in Bishapur.
 Tradition account from Shaykh Fati al-Basri regarding Zubayr ibn al-Awwam descendants.

Secondary sources

Bibliography 

 
 
 
 
 
 <

External online biography 

 
 
 
 
 
 
 
 
 
 Zuberi Clan History – 2009 archive
 Talha and Zubair – 2011 archive

656 deaths
594 births
Sahabah martyrs
Sahabah who participated in the battle of Badr
Sahabah who participated in the battle of Uhud
Sahabah hadith narrators
People of the First Fitna
Muslim conquest of Egypt
Banu Asad (Quraysh)
People of the Muslim conquest of the Levant
Articles containing Arabic-language text
Arab generals
Arab people of the Arab–Byzantine wars
Generals of the medieval Islamic world
People of the Muslim conquest of Persia
People from the Rashidun Caliphate
Generals of the Rashidun Caliphate
Hadith scholars
7th-century jurists
7th-century Arabs
Quraysh
CS1 Arabic-language sources (ar)

Khalid Basalamah